Gullikson is a surname. Notable people with the surname include:

 Tim Gullikson (1951–1996), American tennis player and coach
 Tom Gullikson (born 1951), American tennis player and coach, twin brother of Tim

See also
 Gullickson
 Gulliksen